Hertfordshire 1 was an English level 10 Rugby Union league with teams from Hertfordshire and parts of north London taking part.  Promoted teams used to move up to Herts/Middlesex 1 and relegation was to Hertfordshire 2 until that division was cancelled at the end of the 1989–90 season.  The division was cancelled in at the end of the 1995–96 campaign after nine seasons due to the merger of the Hertfordshire and Middlesex regional leagues.

Original teams
When league rugby began in 1987 this division contained the following teams:

Barnet
Harpenden
Hemel Hempstead
Old Elizabethans
Stevenage Town
Tring
Verulamians
Welwyn

Hertfordshire 1 honours

Hertfordshire 1 (1987–1992)

The original Hertfordshire 1 was a tier 8 league with promotion up to London 3 North West and relegation down to Hertfordshire 2 until that league was cancelled at the end of the 1989–90 season.

Hertfordshire 1 (1992–1996)

The creation of Herts/Middlesex at the beginning of the 1992–93 season meant that Hertfordshire 1 dropped to become a tier 9 league.  The introduction of National 5 South for the 1993–94 season meant that Hertfordshire 1 dropped another level to become a tier 10 league for the years that National 5 South was active.  Promotion was into the new Herts/Middlesex league and. as this was the lowest tier league for Hertfordshire based clubs, there was no relegation.  The merging of the Hertfordshire and Middlesex regional divisions at the end of the 1996–97 mean that Hertfordshire 1 was cancelled.

Number of league titles

Barnet (1)
Hemel Hempstead (1)
Letchworth Garden City (1)
Old Elizabethans (1) 
St Albans (1)
Tring
Verulamians (1)
Welwyn (1)

Notes

See also
London & SE Division RFU
Hertfordshire RFU
English rugby union system
Rugby union in England

References

10
Rugby union in Hertfordshire